Municipal League Kikinda - Žitište is one of the 52 Intermunicipal football league in Serbia. Inter-municipal league as a sixth level league football competition in Serbia. In league clubs compete with area of Kikinda and Žitište, which is managed by the Municipal Football Association Kikinda - Žitište. The league was formed in 2009 and it has 6 teams. Champion goes directly or through a barrage of PFL Zrenjanin.

Champions history

Clubs for the season 2022–23

External links 
 Results and Table „Kikinda - Žitište Municipal League“ www.srbijasport.net

See also
Serbia national football team
Serbian Superliga
Serbian First League
Srpska Liga
Vojvodina League East
Zone Leagues

6